Psilocybe magnispora is a species of psilocybin mushroom in the family Hymenogastraceae. Found in Thailand, where it grows on the rotting dung of Elephas, it was described as new to science in 2009.

See also
List of psilocybin mushrooms
List of Psilocybe species

References

External links

Entheogens
Fungi described in 2009
Psychoactive fungi
magnispora
Psychedelic tryptamine carriers
Fungi of Asia
Taxa named by Gastón Guzmán